Habit is an unincorporated community located in Daviess County, Kentucky, United States.

A post office was established in the community in 1884, and named for the local English-American blacksmith Frederick Habitt.  Portions of the Ann Patchett novel The Patron Saint of Liars take place in the town.

References

Unincorporated communities in Daviess County, Kentucky
Unincorporated communities in Kentucky